Kesikköprü Bridge (literally "Broken bridge") is a historical bridge in Central Anatolia, Turkey.

It is to the south of the village with the same name and over Kızılırmak River (Hallys of the antiquity).

According to the inscription of the bridge on the east side it was constructed by Kaykaus II of The Seljuks of Anatolia in 1248.

Although the original material is limestone in a later restoration, other types of stones were used. The bridge is an arch type bridge with 13 arches. The feet under the arches are supported by triangular bulges.

References

Bridges in Turkey
Buildings and structures in Kırşehir Province
Bridges over the Kızılırmak